John Cardon Debney (born August 18, 1956) is an American composer and conductor of film, television, and video game scores. His work encompasses a variety of mediums and genres including comedy, horror, thriller, and action-adventure. He is a long-time collaborator of The Walt Disney Company, having written music for their films, television series, and theme parks.

Debney has been the recipient of three Primetime Emmy Awards, and an Academy Award nomination for his score for Mel Gibson's The Passion of the Christ (2004).

Early life and education
The son of Disney Studios producer Louis Debney (Zorro, The Mickey Mouse Club), John was born and raised in Glendale, California, nearby to Disney. He began guitar lessons at age six and played in rock bands in college. Debney earned his B.A. degree in Music Composition from the California Institute of Arts in 1979.

Career 
After ending his career with Disney, Debney worked for Mike Post. Debney furthered his hands-on training by working with Hanna-Barbera composer Hoyt Curtin. After this, Debney went on to score television projects as diverse as Disneyland, Star Trek: The Next Generation, Star Trek: Deep Space Nine, SeaQuest DSV, A Pup Named Scooby-Doo, The Cape, The Lazarus Man, Piggsburg Pigs!, The Further Adventures of SuperTed, Doctor Who, Cagney and Lacey, Tiny Toon Adventures, The Young Riders, The New Yogi Bear Show, Police Academy: The Animated Series, Fame, Captain Power and the Soldiers of the Future, Dragon's Lair, Freshman Dorm, Pop Quiz and Dink, the Little Dinosaur, for which he won an Emmy for Best Main Title. In the early 1990s, Debney began to score indie films and Disneyland attractions. In 1991, Debney composed the music for Phantom Manor and It's a Small World in Disneyland Paris and SpectroMagic at Magic Kingdom. In 1993, he scored his first studio feature, the Disney comedy Hocus Pocus starring Bette Midler.

In 1994, Debney wrote Friends Forever with Greg Scelsa from Greg & Steve's album We All Live Together, Vol. 5

Debney has since gone on to have a career composing scores for many films including: The Passion of the Christ, Bruce Almighty, I Know What You Did Last Summer, Elf, Sin City, Chicken Little, Liar Liar, Spy Kids, The Scorpion King, The Princess Diaries and Predators.

Debney has also composed scores for the video games Lair and The Sims Medieval. In 2010, he composed the theme music for the Nickelodeon television series Supah Ninjas.

He composed some of Disney Parks's Nighttime Spectaculars, including: World Of Color Celebrate! in Disney's California Adventure, The Magic, The Memories And You! and Celebrate the Magic in Walt Disney World Magic Kingdom and Celebrate! Tokyo Disneyland in Tokyo Disneyland, as well as an arrangement of "When You Wish Upon a Star" as a fanfare for the Walt Disney Pictures logo from 1985 to 2006.

Filmography

Film

1980s

1990s

2000s

2010s

2020s

Television

Video games

Awards and nominations

References

External links 
 
 
 
 John Debney Tribute at Filmtracks.com

1956 births
American classical composers
American conductors (music)
American film score composers
American male classical composers
American male conductors (music)
American male film score composers
American television composers
Animated film score composers
Blue Sky Studios people
Classical musicians from California
Hanna-Barbera people
Living people
Male television composers
Musicians from Glendale, California
Musicians from Los Angeles
People from Greater Los Angeles
Sony Classical Records artists
Varèse Sarabande Records artists
Video game composers
Walt Disney Animation Studios people
Sony Pictures Animation people
DreamWorks Animation people